

List of temples

References

External links 
 Pakshi Theertham
List of Shiva temples in India
List of Shiva temples in India - The Divine India

Lists of Hindu temples in India
Hindu temples in Bihar
Bihar-related lists